Paeon or Paion (gen.: Παίονος)  in Greek mythology was a Paionian mentioned in the Iliad of Homer as the father of the warrior Agastrophus, slain by Diomedes, while fighting on the side of Troy in the Trojan War. He is presumably the same as the Paeon  mentioned in Quintus Smyrnaeus' Posthomerica as the father by Cleomede of Laophoon, a companion of Asteropaios slain by Meriones.

Notes

References
Connor, Peter, "Paeon" in Gods, Goddeses, and Mythology, Volume 8, editor, C. Scott Littleton,  Marshall Cavendish, 2005. 
 Homer, The Iliad with an English Translation by A.T. Murray, Ph.D. in two volumes. Cambridge, Massachusetts, Harvard University Press; London, William Heinemann, Ltd. 1924. Online version at the Perseus Digital Library.
 Parada, Carlos, Genealogical Guide to Greek Mythology, Jonsered, Paul Åströms Förlag, 1993. .
Quintus Smyrnaeus, The Trojan Epic: Posthomerica, JHU Press, 2007. .

Paeonian mythology
Characters in Greek mythology